Florida's 1st House District elects one member of the Florida House of Representatives. The district is represented by Michelle Salzman. This district is located in the Florida Panhandle and encompasses part of the Pensacola metropolitan area. The district covers the northern portion of Escambia County. The largest city in the district is Ferry Pass. As of the 2010 Census, the district's population is 156,030.

This district contains the University of West Florida, located in Ferry Pass.

Bolley Johnson served as the Speaker of the Florida House of Representatives from 1992 until 1994.

Representatives from 1967 to the present

See also 
 Florida's 1st Senate district
 Florida's 1st congressional district

References 

01
Escambia County, Florida